Kathleen James is an American politician, who was elected to the Vermont House of Representatives in 2018. She represents the Bennington-4 House District as a member of the Democratic Party.

James serves as Clerk of the House Committee on Education. She also serves as a member of the Canvassing Committee.

An out lesbian, James is married to Alexandra Heintz.

References

External links

Living people
Democratic Party members of the Vermont House of Representatives
LGBT state legislators in Vermont
Women state legislators in Vermont
21st-century American politicians
Lesbian politicians
Year of birth missing (living people)
21st-century American women politicians